Grandmaster, in comics, may refer to:
 Grandmaster (DC Comics), fictional character, a type of Manhunter agent, in the DC Comics universe. First appeared in 1987
 Grandmaster (Marvel Comics), fictional character, one of the "elders of the universe" in the Marvel Comics universe. First appeared in 1969
 Grand Master Robo, supervillain against Super Commando Dhruva in the Indian Raj Comics universe

See also
 Grandmaster (disambiguation)